Monroe Nichols IV (born September 24, 1983) is an American politician who has served in the Oklahoma House of Representatives from the 72nd district since 2016.

Early life
Monroe Nichols IV was born September 24, 1983 to Ramona Curtis and Monroe Nichols III. He later graduated high school from Bishop Louis Reicher Catholic School in Waco, Texas where he played on his high school's football team as a quarterback. He attended the University of Tulsa where in 2002 he walked-on the football team as receiver. When interviewed about pursuing an NFL career in 2005, Nichols told the Tulsa World he instead wanted to focus on politics and hoped to one day become Governor of his home state of Texas.

Early career
In 2006, shortly after graduating from college Nichols was hired by Tulsa mayor Kathy Taylor to work on a crime initiative to prevent gang activity. He worked again for Taylor as her campaign manager for the 2013 Tulsa mayoral election.

Nichols also worked as the chief of staff for former OU-Tulsa president Gerry Clancy, as an economic development manager at the Oklahoma Department of Career and Technology Education, and as a director of business retention and expansion programs for the Tulsa Regional Chamber of Commerce. In 2014, he cofounded the nonprofit ImpactTulsa. From 2014 to 2016 he served on the Tulsa Technology Center Board of Education.

2008 campaign
Nichols first campaigned for the 72nd district of the Oklahoma House of Representatives in 2008 while working in Tulsa mayor Kathy Taylor's office. Incumbent Darrell Gilbert was term limited from seeking re-election. He received 9% of the vote while Seneca Scott and Christie Breedlove advanced to a runoff.

Oklahoma House of Representatives

2016 election
Nichols was listed as one of over 30 individuals who filed for office with ties to education in 2016.
During the 2016 election, no Libertarian or independent candidate filed to run in district 72.
One Republican, Whitney Cole, filed to run in the district. However, Nichols filed a challenge to their candidacy and the Election Board removed them from the ballot, making the Democratic primary election the de facto election for the seat. 
Maria Barnes, a former Tulsa city councilor, and Nichols were the only two candidates. 
The Tulsa World endorsed Nichols in the 2016 Democratic primary election calling him a voice "for the future."
Nichols was also endorsed by Kathy Taylor. He narrowly defeated Maria Barnes in the primary election. 
On November 17, 2016, Monroe Nichols became the first African American elected to represent Oklahoma House District 72.

56th Oklahoma Legislature
On May 1, 2017, Nichols co-hosted the first Hispanic Cultural Day at the state Capitol.

2018 election
In 2018,  A.C. Forst challenged Nichols in the Democratic primary. Forst campaigned on being more politically moderate than Nichols. Nichols was endorsed by the Tulsa World and Tulsa Regional Chamber of Commerce. Nichols won the Democratic primary and faced no general election opponent.

57th Oklahoma Legislature
In January 2020, Nichols was one of over 200 signatories asking Tulsa mayor G.T. Bynum to not bring Live PD to Tulsa. Later that month he was one of a group of lawmakers who criticized Governor Kevin Stitt for appointing members to the University of Oklahoma board of regents who live outside of the state. All three members of the board appointed by Stitt had recently missed an eight hour board meeting.  In June, he called the creation of a state level independent monitor to investigate police shootings and an Oklahoma law enforcement database to alert departments if an applicant has previously resigned other employment during an internal investigation and prior to being fired for cause.

2020 election
In 2020, Maria Barnes challenged Nichols in the Democratic primary for a second time. The Tulsa World endorsed Nichols again for the 2020 election. Nichols defeated Barnes with 69% of the vote in the Democratic primary. Republican Ismail A. Shan had been removed from the ballot after a challenge to his candidacy for living outside the district. Therefore, Nichols was re-elected without a general election.

During the 2020 election cycle Nichols also worked as a senior advisor for the Michael Bloomberg presidential campaign in Oklahoma.

58th Oklahoma Legislature
In May 2021, Nichols stepped down from the Tulsa Race Massacre Centennial Commission in protest of Governor Kevin Stitt's signing of HB 1775, calling the bill "a direct shot in the face for all of us who have been working hard on the commission, for all of us who have been working toward recognition, reconciliation. I would have to say it was the most disruptive thing that a governor could have done. And Kevin Stitt did it with a smile on his face."

2022 election
While Nichols reportedly considered running in the 2022 Oklahoma gubernatorial election, he declined after both Connie Johnson and Joy Hofmeister announced their campaigns. Nichols was re-elected to his house seat without opposition in 2022.

Nichols also works as the Director of Policy and Partnerships for StriveTogether, a nonprofit.

Electoral history

Nichols was re-elected without opposition in 2022.

Awards
The Tulsa Business Journal 2011 class of The Tulsa 40
 Tulsa Business & Legal News 2015 Man of Distinction

Publications
Four things I learned in the 2017 Legislature, column in the Tulsa World. 25 June 2017.
Oklahoma Democrats offer state budget alternative that is truly business friendly, column in the Tulsa World. May 9, 2019.
Gun safety reform is a call for citizen action, column in the Tulsa World. June 9, 2022.

References

1983 births
21st-century American politicians
African-American state legislators in Oklahoma
American athlete-politicians
Candidates in the 2008 United States elections
Living people
Democratic Party members of the Oklahoma House of Representatives
Tulsa Golden Hurricane football players
University of Oklahoma alumni